The 1982 Seattle Seahawks season was the team's seventh season with the National Football League (NFL), which was interrupted by a 57-day players strike, which began on September 21, after the second game.

The Seahawks lost their first two games, and three weeks into the strike, head coach Jack Patera and general manager John Thompson were fired on Wednesday, October 13, and Mike McCormack took over as head coach for the remainder of 

After the strike ended in November, the Seahawks won twice to even their record  then lost a close game to the Los Angeles Raiders. After beating the Chicago Bears the next week, the team was upset  in the Kingdome by the New England Patriots. Seattle finished  and missed the expanded playoffs as the second team out in the tiebreaker.

Offseason

1982 draft class

Personnel

Staff

Final roster

     Starters in bold.
 (*) Denotes players that were selected for the 1983 Pro Bowl.

Schedule

Preseason

Source: Seahawks Media Guides

Regular season
By finishing in fifth place in 1981, Seattle plays the two NFC fifth-place finishers, the Cardinals and Bears, and two games against the other AFC fifth-place finisher, the Patriots.

Bold indicates division opponents.
Source: 1982 NFL season results

Standings
Playoff teams were determined by the top eight conference teams.

Game Summaries

Preseason

Week P1: vs. St. Louis Cardinals

Week P2: at Minnesota Vikings

Week P3: at Los Angeles Rams

Week P4: vs. San Francisco 49ers

Regular season

Week 1: vs. Cleveland Browns

Week 2: at Houston Oilers

Week 11: at Denver Broncos

Week 12: vs. Pittsburgh Steelers

Week 13: at Los Angeles Raiders

Week 14: vs. Chicago Bears

Week 15: vs. New England Patriots

Week 16: at Cincinnati Bengals

Week 17: vs. Denver Broncos

References

External links
 Seahawks draft history at NFL.com
 1982 NFL season results at NFL.com

Seattle
Seattle Seahawks seasons